Oppression is the fourth studio album by American heavy metal band Incite.  It was released on April 22, 2016, through Minus Head Records and was produced by Steve Evetts.

Track listing

References 

2016 albums
Incite albums
Albums produced by Steve Evetts